Mian Mohammad Saeed (31 August 1910 – 23 August 1979) was a Pakistani cricketer, born in Lahore. He was the first  captain of Pakistan.

Career
A right-handed batsman, Mohammad was the first captain of the Pakistan cricket team, before they were awarded Test status. He led them against the touring West Indies team in 1948-49, when he scored a century in the drawn match, and away against Ceylon in 1948-49 (Pakistan's first cricket tour) and 1949–50.

In a career that extended from 1930 to 1954, he played for various Indian teams, including Southern Punjab and Northern India in the Ranji Trophy in the 1930s and 1940s, and for Punjab cricket teams in Pakistan in the late 1940s and 1950s. In all first-class matches he made 2439 runs at an average of 29.74 with three centuries and a highest score of 175 for Northern India against Southern Punjab in the Ranji Trophy in 1946–47, when he captained Northern India to a 195-run victory.

His son Yawar Saeed played for Somerset, and his daughter married the Pakistani Test bowler Fazal Mahmood.

After retirement he served as a cricket administrator and at the time of his sudden death he was chairman of the Pakistan Test selectors.

References

External links
 
 Mian Mohammad Saeed at PTV Sports website

1910 births
1979 deaths
Punjab (Pakistan) cricketers
Patiala cricketers
Southern Punjab cricketers
Northern India cricketers
Cricketers from Lahore
Pakistani cricketers
Commonwealth XI cricketers
Muslims cricketers
North Zone cricketers